Lee Waite is an American stock trader and corporate executive currently serving as the current chief executive officer and president of Citigroup Holdings, Japan.

Education 
He received his M.B.A. from Duke University's Fuqua School of Business.

Business career 
After graduating from Duke, he joined E.F. Hutton in capital markets trading. His career continued through various mergers including Shearson Lehman Hutton and Salomon Brothers, and eventually Citi. In 2007, he moved into transaction services, and eventually served as chief operating officer of Citi's Equities Division, before being appointed head of North American Markets and Securities.

See also 
 Citigroup
 List of Duke University People

References

Stock traders
Living people
Year of birth missing (living people)